M. orientalis  may refer to:
 Malus orientalis, the eastern crabapple
 Meliphaga orientalis, the Mountain honeyeater, a bird species found in Indonesia and Papua New Guinea
 Melogale orientalis, the Javan ferret-badger, a mammal species endemic to Java, Indonesia
 Merops orientalis, the green bee-eater or little green bee-eater, a bird species found widely distributed across sub-Saharan Africa
 Millettia orientalis, a legume species found only in Madagascar
 Mitra orientalis, a sea snail species
 Mogurnda orientalis, the eastern mogurnda, a fish species endemic to Papua New Guinea
 Mouldingia orientalis, an air-breathing land snail species endemic to Australia
 Myurella orientalis, a sea snail species

See also
 Orientalis (disambiguation)